Land Down Under may refer to:

Down Under, slang used for Australia
"Down Under" (song), a song by Men at Work
Love Me Again (film), a Filipino film initially titled Land Down Under